Jentink's squirrel (Sundasciurus jentinki) is a species of rodent in the family Sciuridae. It is named in honor of the Dutch zoologist Fredericus Anna Jentink. It is found in Indonesia and Malaysia. Its natural habitat is subtropical or tropical dry forests. It is threatened by habitat loss.

References

Thorington, R. W. Jr. and R. S. Hoffman. 2005. Family Sciuridae. pp. 754–818 in Mammal Species of the World a Taxonomic and Geographic Reference. D. E. Wilson and D. M. Reeder eds. Johns Hopkins University Press, Baltimore.

Sundasciurus
Rodents of Indonesia
Rodents of Malaysia
Endemic fauna of Borneo
Mammals of Borneo
Mammals described in 1887
Taxa named by Oldfield Thomas
Taxonomy articles created by Polbot